The South African cricket team toured Zimbabwe for three One Day Internationals in August 2007. The tour will see both teams in action for the first time since the 2007 Cricket World Cup, and will be played two weeks before the start of the 2007 Twenty20 World Championship to be held by the South Africans. South Africa's A team will also be touring, playing against a Zimbabwean Select XI on two occasions for First-class matches.

Squads

 Players greyed out withdrew from the squad.

Matches

First ODI

Second ODI

Third ODI

South Africa A tour
South Africa A also toured Zimbabwe, playing two First-class matches against a Zimbabwean Select XI.

South Africa A v Zimbabwe Select XI - first First-class match

South Africa A v Zimbabwe Select XI - second First-class match

References

Cricinfo - Tour homepage
Cricinfo - A Team tour homepage
CricketArchive - Tour homepage 
CricketArchive - A Team tour homepage 

2007 in cricket
2007 in Zimbabwean sport
2007
2007–08 South African cricket season